Sahang (ساهنگ) is a town in Gujar Khan Tehsil, Punjab, Pakistan. Raja Sajjad Sarwar is chairman of the union council. Sahang is also the chief town of the Union Council Sahang which is an administrative subdivision of the Tehsil Sahang is one of the most biggest and important union councils of tehsil Gujar Khan. The notable tribes of this union council are Pakhral Rajpoot Minhas, Gakhars, Awan Malik, Dar, Rajput, Gujar, Bhatti, and Nagrial.

References
Populated places in Gujar Khan Tehsil
Union councils of Gujar Khan Tehsil